John Allen Wisden Nicks (born 22 April 1929) is a British figure skating coach and former pair skater. With his sister, Jennifer Nicks, he is the 1953 World champion. As a coach, his skating pupils have included Peggy Fleming, pairs team Tai Babilonia and Randy Gardner, Kristi Yamaguchi, Paul Wylie, Sasha Cohen, Rory Flack and Ashley Wagner.

Personal life 
Nicks, the son of a sporting goods store owner, grew up in Brighton, England. He is the brother of Jennifer Nicks. Nicks moved to the United States in the 1960s with his wife Denise, son Christopher and daughter Carolyn and was briefly an undocumented immigrant but received his green card a few weeks later. He married American former ice dancer Yvonne Littlefield. He became a U.S. citizen around 2008.

Career 
Nicks began skating at age 10 or 11 after his father – who knew nothing about skating but wanted to sell skating equipment – put him in skates in order to learn more about them. John and Jennifer competed initially as singles skaters but agreed to train together in pair skating upon the request of the British association, which promised to support them. They made their first Olympic appearance at the 1948 Winter Olympics, where they finished 8th. Recalling the competition in a January 2013 interview, John said, "it was snowing so much they had to stop the skating after every three skaters to clear the snow." He was impressed by the American skaters at the event, in particular Dick Button – this would later influence his decision to come to the United States.

The Nicks siblings won the first of their four World medals, silver, at the 1950 World Championships. They won World bronze the next two seasons and competed at their second Olympics in 1952, where they finished 4th. The pair won gold at the 1953 World Championships in Davos, Switzerland. John said, "We were skating outdoors back then, and the temperature was, like, 28 degrees during a practice. It was so cold that I remember when I was taking off my boots that my laces were frozen." The siblings retired from competition after the event.

John moved to South Africa, where he skated in shows and began coaching, but moved back to England in 1960 and eventually on to Canada, coaching in Trail, British Columbia. Following the February 1961 crash of Sabena Flight 548, which killed the entire US figure skating team, he received four offers of a coaching job in the United States and agreed to coach at a rink in Paramount, California owned by Frank Zamboni. He first appeared at the U.S. Championships as a coach in 1965.

As of 2012, Nicks coaches in Aliso Viejo, California. He has coached over 1,200 skaters during his career. In April 2013, he said he would no longer travel but would still coach Ashley Wagner at the Aliso Viejo Ice Palace. Nicks was inducted into the World Figure Skating Hall of Fame in 2000. He appeared as a judge on the 2006 FOX television program Skating with Celebrities.

His students have included:

Peggy Fleming
Angela Nikodinov
Jo Jo Starbuck / Kenneth Shelley
Tai Babilonia / Randy Gardner
Tiffany Chin
Dana Graham / Paul Wylie
Christopher Bowman
Natasha Kuchiki
Jenni Meno / Todd Sand
Kristi Yamaguchi / Rudy Galindo
Naomi Nari Nam
Sasha Cohen
Ashley Wagner (since June 2011)
Michael Christian Martinez
Michael Novales
Rory Flack

Competitive highlights with Nicks

References

External links
Brighton and Hove - John and Jennifer Nicks

1929 births
Living people
Sportspeople from Brighton
American figure skating coaches
British male pair skaters
British emigrants to the United States
Olympic figure skaters of Great Britain
Figure skaters at the 1948 Winter Olympics
Place of birth missing (living people)
Figure skaters at the 1952 Winter Olympics
World Figure Skating Championships medalists
European Figure Skating Championships medalists